Charged Productions is an animation studio based in Brooklyn, New York.

Created in 1999, they transformed their previous skills into a fully operational full-scale production company, making everything from feature films, to national commercial spots, live-action promos, original animated series, pilots, puppet series, character and avatar development, and network IDs.

Work

Series
The PJs (seasons 2-3 only) (2000–2001)
The Bernie Mac Show ("Tryptophan-tasy" episode) (2002)
The Tech Of (2002)
99.9% True (2003)
Smoking Gun TV (2005)
The Tomatoes (2006)
Glenn Martin, DDS (2009)

Commercials
Cartoon Network "(Unknown)" (2001)
Nickelodeon "The Dog Spot"  (2002)
Oxygen "Bendables ID's" (2003)
Nike "Can-Man" (2004)
Subway "Monster Jogger" (2007)
UPS "Dinosaur" (2011)

External links
 

American animation studios

References